Antônio Edgard da Silveira, commonly known as Mitotônio, (22 February 1916 – 1 April 1951) was a footballer who played as a left wing for Ceará Sporting Club.

Career
Born in Granja, Ceará, Mitotônio began playing club football for Fortaleza Esporte Clube. He joined Ceará in 1941 and would win three Ceará state championships during his 10 years with the club. He also had a brief spell with Náutico in 1945.

On 31 March 1951, Mitotônio became ill during the first half of Ceará's Campeonato Cearense match against Gentilândia at Estádio Presidente Vargas. He scored the opening goal for Ceará, but did not play in the second half. The team sent Mitotônio to hospital where he was released in the evening after treatment. He died the following morning at his home at age 35. His death was attributed to a hemorrhage resulting from stomach congestion.

References

1916 births
1951 deaths
Brazilian footballers
Fortaleza Esporte Clube players
Ceará Sporting Club players
Clube Náutico Capibaribe players
Association football players who died while playing

Association footballers not categorized by position
Sport deaths in Brazil
Sportspeople from Ceará